George Worthington may refer to:

George Worthington (businessman) (1813–1871), American merchant and banker
George Worthington (tennis) (1928–1964), Australian tennis player
George Worthington (bishop) (1840–1908), bishop of Nebraska
George Worthington (cricketer) (1822–1900), English cricketer
George Worthington (ship) - A schooner that ran ashore west of Cleveland in November 1866 near whilst carrying iron ore